Bird Mountain, or similar, may refer to:

 Bird Mountain (New Jersey), U.S., a peak of the Kittatinny Mountains
 Bird Mountain, Morgan County, Tennessee, U.S.
 Bird Mountain, Taconic Mountains, Vermont, U.S.
 Bird Mountain, Indian Heaven Wilderness, Washington, U.S.

See also
 Fuglefjellet ('Bird mountain'), Queen Maud Land, Antarctica
 Tututepec ('Bird mountain'), Villa de Tututepec de Melchor Ocampo, Mexico
 Jabal al-Tair Island ('Bird Mountain Island'), Yemen
 Mount Bird, Antarctica
 Byrd Mountains, Antarctica
 Akira Toriyama, mangaka, creator of Dragon Ball, who refers to himself as bird since Toriyama (鳥山) means "Bird Mountain".